The American Forensic Association is an American organisation which promotes and supports competitive debating and public speaking in high schools and colleges in the United States.

Members
Cross Examination Debate Association
National Parliamentary Debate Association
American Debate Association
International Debate Education Association

Publications and research
The association publishes several scholarly journals including:
 Argumentation and Advocacy 
 The Journal of the American Forensic Association 
 The AFA Newsletter

Collegiate competitions
The association holds two collegiate national tournaments annually.  The tournaments brings students from across the nation to compete for national championships in both individual events and debate. Students reach the tournaments through a rigorous at-large and district qualification system verified by organizational officers. Since their inception, the tournaments have served hundreds of colleges and universities and thousands of students. The tournaments include:
 National Speech Tournament (commonly known as AFA-NST) 
 National Debate Tournament (commonly known as AFA-NDT)

See also 

 Competitive debate in the United States

References

 https://www.tandfonline.com/doi/abs/10.1080/10417945109371177?journalCode=rsjc18
 https://www.tandfonline.com/doi/abs/10.1080/00028533.2000.11951653?journalCode=rafa20

External links

Educational organizations based in the United States
Student debating societies
Youth organizations based in the United States